Bero may refer to:

Places:
 Bero (woreda), a woreda in Ethiopia
 Bero block, an administrative block in Ranchi district, Jharkhand, India
 Bero, India, a village in Jharkhand state, India
 Bero River, Angola

People:
 Bero (name), a list of people with either the given name or surname
 Bernhard Rosenkränzer, free-software developer

Other uses:
 Bero railway station, in Purulia district, West Bengal, India
 Bero Field, a private airport in Oregon, United States
 Bero (fish), a genus of Sculpin fish
 Be-Ro, a flour brand
 Owiniga language, also known as Bero, spoken in New Guinea

See also
 Bera (disambiguation)
 Beru (disambiguation)